John Thomas Murray  (1 April 1935 – 24 July 2018) was an English cricketer. He played in 21 Tests for England between 1961 and 1967.

Life and career
Murray was educated at the St John's Church of England School in Notting Hill, London. He played football as a wing half in his youth and was part of the Brentford youth team which reached the semi-finals of the inaugural FA Youth Cup in the 1952–53 season.

Murray made his debut as a wicket-keeper for Middlesex in 1952, aged 17 years and 54 days. Most elegant behind the stumps, he is acknowledged as one of the most distinguished wicket-keepers in the history of the game. His batting prowess was such that he scored 1,000 runs in a season six times with Middlesex, and scored a Test century in 1966 when he batted at number nine against the West Indies. He played for Middlesex in 508 first-class matches between 1952 and 1975, and for England in 21 Tests. His tally of 1,527 first-class dismissals set a world record until it was broken by Bob Taylor in 1983. Murray was selected as one of the Wisden Cricketers of the Year in 1967.

He later served as an England selector and on the Middlesex General Committee.

He married Colleen Bryan in 1958.They had a daughter Deborah and a son Nick. 

He died on 24 July 2018 at the age of 83, having been taken ill at Lord's while watching a Middlesex match.

References

External links

Wisden article for Murray's 1967 Cricketer of the Year selection

1935 births
2018 deaths
England Test cricketers
English cricketers of 1946 to 1968
English cricketers
Middlesex cricketers
Combined Services cricketers
Commonwealth XI cricketers
International Cavaliers cricketers
Wisden Cricketers of the Year
Members of the Order of the British Empire
England cricket team selectors
Players cricketers
Marylebone Cricket Club cricketers
D. H. Robins' XI cricketers
L. E. G. Ames' XI cricketers
T. N. Pearce's XI cricketers
Wicket-keepers
Marylebone Cricket Club Australian Touring Team cricketers
Cricketers from the Royal Borough of Kensington and Chelsea